Michał Marcjanik (born 15 December 1994) is a Polish professional footballer who plays as a centre-back for Arka Gdynia.

Club career

Empoli

Loan to Carpi
After joining Empoli in the summer of 2018, he remained on the bench for every Serie A game in the first half of the season. On 31 January 2019, he joined Serie B club Carpi on loan until the end of the season.

Loan to Wisła Płock
On 1 July 2019, Marcjanik was loaned out to Wisła Płock for the 2019–20 season.

Return to Arka Gdynia
On 9 August 2020, he signed a 3-year contract with Arka Gdynia.

Career statistics

Club

1 Including Polish SuperCup.

Honours

Club
Arka Gdynia
 Polish Cup: 2016–17
 Polish Super Cup: 2017

References

External links
 
 

1994 births
Living people
Polish footballers
Poland under-21 international footballers
Polish expatriate footballers
Arka Gdynia players
Empoli F.C. players
A.C. Carpi players
Wisła Płock players
Ekstraklasa players
I liga players
Expatriate footballers in Italy
Sportspeople from Gdynia
Association football defenders